Taj Mahal: An Eternal Love Story is a 2005 Indian historical drama film directed by Akbar Khan. The movie starred Kabir Bedi, Sonya Jehan, Manisha Koirala, Arbaaz Khan, Vaquar Shaikh, Rahil Azam and Pooja Batra in the title roles. The movie was released on 18 November in India.

The soundtrack was composed by film composer Naushad Ali, his last work before his death on 5 May 2006.

The film was released in Pakistan by Eveready Pictures and did record business at the box office.

Plot
The story begins with Shah Jahan, known as Prince Khurram when he is about nineteen years old. Khurram was Emperor Jahangir's favourite son, whom Jahangir wanted to be the future Emperor of India, along with his wife Nur Jahan, who was well aware of this fact. Noor Jahan was married once previously, but when her first husband died, Jahangir married her. Ladli Begum is Noor Jahan's daughter from her first marriage. Noor Jahan is a shrewd lady, who wants the best for herself and her daughter and she aspires for Ladli Begum to marry Prince Khurram so she that she will become the Empress of the Mughal Dynasty.

Khurram's passion for hunting leads him into a jungle, and one day while hunting he meets Arjumand Bano. Their meeting was love at first sight, with Khurram attracted to Arjumand Bano's innocence and beauty while Arjumand was impressed by Khurram's great personality. Arjumand Bano is Asaf Khan's (Aly Khan) daughter, Empress Noor Jahan's brother. Khurram and Bano again meet at the Meena Bazaar, where finally both of them declare their love for each other. Ladli Begum learns of their love, but she keeps on wooing Prince Khurram. Noor Jahan sees this love as a hindrance to her plans of making her daughter the future Empress of India and she succeeds in turning Emperor Jahangir against his own son, Khurram.

Noor Jahan sends her secret lover and the warrior Mahabat Khan to fight Khurram and to kill Arjumand Bano. As a result, a war takes place in which forces are also sent by Emperor Jahangir against Khurram. When Khurram meets Jahangir, he declares that Arjumand Bano was more superior to him than the Mughal Dynasty. As a result, relations become even more bitter between the father and the son. However, Arjumand Bano, who was a peace-loving person, agreed to forget Khurram and asked him to marry Kandahari Begum, an Iranian princess, who was chosen by Emperor Jahangir for Khurram. Khurram, due to Arjumand's insistence, marries Kandahari Begum while on the other hand, Ladli Begum marries to Khurram's brother. After Emperor Jahangir dies, Khurram becomes Prince Shah Jahan and ruler of the Mughal dynasty. He finally marries the love of his life, Arjumand Bano, who becomes Mumtaz Mahal. The couple lives happily for a while until misfortune occurs.

Khurram must leave for war, but a pregnant Aarjumand chooses to also go with him, as she used to accompany Shah Jahan in all his battles. Khurram tries to return to the camp from the battle but takes a long time to return as he forgets his way. While he is lost, Mumtaz Mahal dies while giving birth to her nineteenth child. During her last breath, Mumtaz Mahal asks Shah Jahan to construct her tomb in a beautiful mausoleum, describing one which would be so beautiful it would express their love for each other to all who visit the mausoleum. Mumtaz's death is the greatest tragedy for Shah Jahan, and as a result, he becomes a completely reformed person. Shah Jahan then starts off to fulfill his wife's last wish, to build Taj Mahal, a beautiful mausoleum to honour the also beautiful Mumtaz Mahal. The Taj Mahal goes on to become the Seventh Wonder of the World.

Time passes, and in future Shah Jahan's sons and daughter grow up. The sons are greedy and eager to inherit their father powers, and as a result, they imprison him in a room from where he can easily see Taj Mahal. He watches his sons fighting against each other to become the Emperor of India and the Mughal Dynasty. Everywhere around him there is violence and warfare, with the beheading of slaves and even brothers are no longer uncommon. In the end, Khurram dies while looking at Taj Mahal, the Taj Mahal that took an astonishing twenty-two years to be made, a tribute showing Shah Jahan as the greatest lover of all time. At his death, his body is laid down next to his love, hence resulting in the culmination of their love after death.

Cast 
Kabir Bedi as Emperor Shah Jahan (or Prince Khurram)
Zulfi Syed as Young Prince Khurram
Sonya Jehan as Arjumand Bano (or Empress Mumtaz Mahal)
Manisha Koirala as Jahan Ara
Pooja Batra as Empress Nur Jahan
Rahil Azam as Prince Shahryar
Arbaaz Ali Khan as Emperor Jahangir
Kim Sharma as Ladli Begum
Vaquar Sheikh as Dara Shikoh
Arbaaz Khan as Aurangzeb
Milind Gunaji as Mahabat Khan
Negar Khan as Princess Kandahari

Music

Taj Mahal: An Eternal Love Story was the last work of renowned musician Naushad Ali, who died on 5 May 2006. The audio was formally released at a gala event in Mumbai at ITC Grand Central Sheraton & Towers, Parel on 16 March 2005 by Times Music in tandem with the home label Mashreq Music. The soundtrack album consists 8 songs, featuring vocals by Hariharan, Kavita Krishnamurthy, Preeti Uttam and Ajoy Chakraborty, and an instrumental theme. A special edition Double CD, consisting of the soundtrack album and 9 instrumental pieces used as the background score, was also released. This was the first time in India that the background score of a film was released simultaneously with the music release. The lyrics were penned by Naqsh Lyallpuri and Syed Gulrez Rashid.

The album received highly positive reviews from critics. The director Akbar Khan praised the music, saying:My film's music needed either a Tansen, a Beethoven or a Naushad... I was only left with the last choice! With the power of his spell bounding music, Naushad has managed to recreate the magic of the bygone era, perfectly complementing the mood of the film. The music does not touch the eardrum & bounce back, but penetrates and lives in the soul of people.The composer Naushad Ali noted about his work:With respect to the music of Taj Mahal – an eternal love story, I have strived to deliver the kind of music that Akbar Khan had in mind, melody being the chief focus. I sincerely hope that I have not let him down and that the music is liked by music aficionados. I have composed music for other films of the Mughal era including Shahjehan, Baiju Bawra and Mughal-e-Azam but each film requires different treatment depending on the situation, environment, characters, theme etc., hence I refuse to be drawn into comparisons. I trust I have been able to do justice to the brief given to me by Akbar Khan for his film. I must use this occasion to also compliment Times Music in taking the commendable step of releasing the background score that I have created at the same time in a separate CD along with the music of the film the two go very much hand in hand. It is equally important to promote the background score of a film which is in fact much more difficult to compose as compared to the music score. Lastly, with every new composition, it still feels that I have just begun and there is a lot more to achieve...
 Disc 1 
Apni Zulfein Mere – Hariharan 
Dilruba Dilruba – Hariharan, Preeti Uttam
Ishq Ki Daastaan – Kavita Krishnamurthy, Preeti Uttam
Mumtaz Tujhe Dekha – Hariharan, Preeti Uttam
Taj Mahal – Hariharan, Preeti Uttam
Tareefe Meena Bazaar – Instrumental
Yeh Kaun Mujhe Yaad Aaya – Ajoy Chakraborty
Taj Mahal (Crescendo) – Hariharan, Preeti Uttam

 Disc 2
Mumtaz's Theme (Part 1) – Instrumental
Jehanara's Karavan  – Instrumental
Khushamdid  – Instrumental
The Birth & The Death  – Instrumental
Meena Bazaar  – Instrumental
The Siege  – Instrumental
Shah Jehan's Theme  – Instrumental
Mughal Intrigue  – Instrumental
Mumtaz's Theme (Part 2) – Instrumental

Awards and nominations

See also
 Taj Mahal (1963 film)

References

External links
Official site

2005 films
2000s Hindi-language films
2000s Urdu-language films
Urdu-language Indian films
2000s historical drama films
Indian historical drama films
Indian biographical drama films
Indian epic films
Love stories
Films set in the Mughal Empire
Films whose production designer won the Best Production Design National Film Award
Films that won the Best Costume Design National Film Award
2005 biographical drama films
Cultural depictions of Shah Jahan
Cultural depictions of Aurangzeb
Cultural depictions of Jahangir